Adriaan Isebree Moens (15 November 1846 – 24 June 1891) was a Dutch physician and physiologist. He is known for his work on arterial stiffness and the propagation of waves in elastic tubes.

Life and family
Adriaan Isebree Moens was the son of Jan Isebree Moens (1793–1865) and Susanna Cornelia De Kater (1805–1862). He was born on November 15, 1846, in Zierikzee, Netherlands. He married Hermine Gertrude Constance Marie Kolff van Oosterwijk (1848–1878) in 1877 and after her death, Caroline Frederika Wilhelmina Kolff Van Oosterwijk (1854–1937) in 1880. He had three children, Gertrude Hermina Moens, Suzanna Cornelia Moens and Neeltje Isebree Moens. He died on 1891 after a chronic illness.

Career
In 1872 after completing a course in engineering at Ghent University, Moens began to study medicine at Leiden University. He became a pathology assistant in 1874 and in 1875 (probably) he took up an appointment as assistant to Adriaan Heynsius, Professor of Physiology at Leiden. In this role he began his work on arterial wave travel using reservoirs, elastic tubes and air chambers. These studies formed the basis of this doctorate in 1877 and were published in a 145-page monograph, Die Pulscurve, in 1878. The key finding of this work was an empirical relationship that described the velocity of pulse propagation in elastic tubes. Except for a numerical constant this turned out to be identical to the theoretical prediction derived by Diederik Korteweg in 1878 and the relationship is now known as the Moens–Korteweg equation. In 1878 he retired from physiological research and became a medical practitioner in Goes. He was offered the chair of physiology in Leiden in 1885 when Hynsius died, but he turned it down. Willem Einthoven was subsequently appointed to the post.

See also
 Moens–Korteweg equation

References

Publications
 Moens A.I. Die Pulscurve. Leiden, E.J. Brill 1878.

Further reading
 Nichols W.W., O'Rourke M.F.. McDonald's Blood Flow in Arteries: Theoretical, Experimental and Clinical Principles. Hodder Arnold; 6th  edition 2011; ; .
 Tijsseling A.S.,  Anderson A. (2012) "A. Isebree Moens and D.J. Korteweg: on the speed of propagation of waves in elastic tubes", BHR Group, Proc. of the 11th Int. Conf. on Pressure Surges (Editor Sandy Anderson), Lisbon, Portugal, October 2012, pp. 227–245, .

1846 births
1891 deaths
Dutch physiologists
Academic staff of Leiden University
Ghent University alumni
Leiden University alumni
People from Zierikzee